Stuart Hailstone (12 April 1962 – 26 August 2020) was a South African squash player, representing South Africa and Scotland. He reached 14th place in the world in 1987, his best career ranking. He was Champion of South Africa three times between 1986 and 1991.

Biography
Born in South Africa, Hailstone grew up in Zimbabwe and lived in England during his professional career. At the end of the Apartheid boycott, he represented South Africa at the 1993 WSF World Team Squash Championships.

Stuart Hailstone died of a stroke on 26 August 2020 at the age of 58.

Awards

Titles
South African Squash Championship (1986, 1989, 1991)

Finals
South African Squash Finalist (1988, 1992)

References

1962 births
2020 deaths
South African male squash players
White South African people